Clarkoceras is a genus of breviconic ellesmerocerid cephalopods, one of only two genera known to have crossed from the Late Cambrian, Trempealeauan, into the Early Ordovician, Gasconadian. (Flower 1964, Teichert 1988); the other being Ectenolites.

Description 
Clarkoceras has a rapidly expanding, laterally compressed, relatively short, endogastrically cyrtoconic shell; The upper or dorsal side is more strongly convex longitudinally than the lower or ventral side is concave. Sutures are essentially straight and close spaced indicating very short camerae (chambers). The siphuncle is relatively large, 0.3 the dorsoventral dimension and is ventral, although not necessarily marginal. (Flower 1964, Furnish and Glenister 1964). Septal necks are straight, reaching about half way back to the previous septum and the connecting rings are thick and layered

Taxonomy
Clarkoceras was first thought by Clarke to be a pilocerid, who in 1897 give it the name Piloceras newton-winchelli. Ruedemann  in 1905 recognized this as belonging to the Ellesmerocerida and renamed it Clarkoceras newton-winchelli (Clarke), which became the genotype.

Distribution and Range
The earliest known Clarkoceras comes from the upper Trempealeauan Wanwankou Member of the Fengshan Formation in northern China, one of twelve ellesmeroceratid genera from the upper Late Cambrian. (Chen and Teichert 1983, Teichert 1988). In North America Clarkoceras is found in early Lower Ordovician, Gasconadian age shallow marine sediments near Smith Basin, State of New York, the Llano Uplift of Central Texas, and the El Paso Group of the eastern Rocky Mountains of Trans-Pecos Texas and Southern New Mexico.

References 

Flower, R.H., 1964,  The Nautiloid Order Ellesmerocerida (Cephalopoda). New Mexico Bureau of Mines and Mineral Resources Memoir 12, Socorro, NM
Furnish and Glenister, 1964, Nautiloidea-Ellesmerocerida, in Teichert and Moore (Eds.), The Treatise on Invertebrate Paleontology Partl K, Nautiloidea. GSA and University of Kansas Press 
Ruedemann, R., 1905, The Structure of Some Primitive Cephalopods, New York State Museum Bulletin 80, pp. 296–341
Teichert, C. 1988, Main Features of Cephalopod Evolution, in M.R Clarke and E.R.Trueman (Eds.), The Mollusca. Academic Press

Prehistoric nautiloid genera
Cambrian molluscs
Ordovician cephalopods
Cambrian animals of North America
Ordovician animals of North America
Cambrian animals of Asia
Ordovician animals of Asia
Cambrian first appearances
Early Ordovician extinctions
Ellesmerocerida